Disodium glutamate, abbreviated DSG, (Na2C5H7NO4) is a sodium salt of glutamic acid.  It is used as a flavoring agent to impart umami flavor.

Formation
Disodium glutamate can be produced by neutralizing glutamic acid with two molar equivalents of sodium hydroxide (NaOH).

See also
 Monosodium glutamate

References

Glutamates
Organic sodium salts
Umami enhancers